Prutah (Hebrew: פרוטה) is a Hebrew term, possibly derived from Aramaic. It refers to a small denomination coin.

History

Antiquity
The prutah was an ancient copper Jewish coin with low value. A loaf of bread in ancient times was worth about 10 prutot (plural of prutah). One prutah was also worth two lepta (singular lepton), which was the smallest denomination minted by the Hasmonean and Herodian Dynasty kings.

Prutot were also minted by the Roman Procurators of the Province of Judea, and later were minted by the Jews during the First Jewish Revolt (sometimes called 'Masada coins').

State of Israel

In modern times, the pruta was a denomination of currency in Israel.

The prutah was introduced shortly after the establishment of the state of Israel, as the 1000th part of the Israeli pound. It replaced the mil, which was the 1000th part of the Palestine pound, a currency issued by the British Mandate of Palestine prior to May 1948.

The prutah was abolished in 1960, when the Israeli government decided to change the subdivision of the Israeli pound into 100 agorot. This move was necessary due to the constant devaluation of the Israeli pound, which rendered coins smaller than 10 prutot redundant.

See also

Hasmonean coinage
Coins of Alexander Jannaeus
Herodian coinage
Roman Procurator coinage
First Jewish Revolt coinage
Bar Kochba Revolt coinage
List of historical currencies
Gerah
Zuz

References

External links
2000 year old Maccabean coin found

Ancient currencies
Jews and Judaism in the Roman Empire
Coins of ancient Rome
Currencies of Israel
Historical currencies, List of
Numismatics
Modern obsolete currencies